Kelly Proper (born 1 May 1988) is an Irish long jumper turned sprinter. She competed in the 200 metres at the 2015 World Championships in Beijing.

International competitions

Personal bests
Outdoor
200 metres – 23.15 (+0.3 m/s, Zürich 2014)
800 metres – 2:21.12 (Ribeira Brava 2013)
100 metres hurdles – 14.80 (0.0 m/s, Firenze 2013)
High jump – 1.66 (Firenze 2013)
Long jump – 6.60 (+1.0 m/s, Brussels 2010)
Shot put – 10.57 (Ribeira Brava 2013)
Javelin throw – 34.11 (Firenze 2013)
Heptathlon – 5442 (Firenze 2013)
Indoor
60 metres – 7.38 (Athlone 2015)
200 metres – 23.27 (Athlone 2015)
Long jump – 6.62 (Vienna 2010)

References

External links

1988 births
Living people
Irish female sprinters
World Athletics Championships athletes for Ireland
Place of birth missing (living people)
Irish female long jumpers